John Gope-Fenepej (born 6 November 1978 in Nouméa, New Caledonia) is a New Caledonian former professional footballer who played as a defender. He is the brother of New Caledonian international footballer Georges Gope-Fenepej.

Career
Gope-Fenepej played for Nantes B before briefly joining Bolton Wanderers on loan, under Sam Allardyce. He later moved on loan to Créteil. In 2002, he left Nantes for Orvault SF, and retired in 2009, at only 31.

References

External links

Gope-Fenepej at footballplus.com

1978 births
Living people
French footballers
New Caledonian footballers
New Caledonian expatriate footballers
FC Nantes players
Bolton Wanderers F.C. players
US Créteil-Lusitanos players
Ligue 2 players
People from Nouméa
Association football defenders
Expatriate footballers in England